This is a list of New York (state) historic sites. It includes 40 state-designated historic sites and parks managed by the New York State Office of Parks, Recreation and Historic Preservation. Twenty-two sites also are National Historic Landmarks (NHLs) of the United States and are described further in List of National Historic Landmarks in New York. The 18 SHS that are not NHLs may be of national importance and be NHL-eligible but, as state-owned and -administered sites, may have less need for additional protection; or may be of state, but not national, importance.

See also 

 Erie Canalway National Heritage Corridor
 Great Camps
 List of National Historic Landmarks in New York
 List of New York state parks
 National Register of Historic Places listings in New York
 New York State Canalway Trail

References

External links
 New York State Office of Parks, Recreation and Historic Preservation: Historic Sites
 New York Historic Sites

 
Historic Sites
New York State
New York
Historic sites